Kafr kasem is a 1975 Syrian drama film directed by Borhane Alaouié. It was entered into the 9th Moscow International Film Festival where it won a Diploma. The subject of the film is the Kafr Qasim massacre that occurred in Israel in 1956.

Cast
 Abdallah Abbassi
 Ahmad Ayub
 Salim Sabri
 Shafiq Manfaluti
 Charlotte Rushdi
 Zaina Hanna
 Intissar Shammar

References

External links
 

1975 films
1975 drama films
Syrian drama films
1970s Arabic-language films
Films directed by Borhane Alaouié
1975 directorial debut films